Sandåtinden is a mountain in Skjåk Municipality in Innlandet county, Norway. The mountain is surrounded by several other notable mountains including Skridulaupen to the northeast, Raudeggi to the northwest, Kvitlenova to the west, Mårådalsfjellet to the southwest, and Dyringshøi and Søverhøi to the southeast. The Sandåbreen glacier lies between Sandåtinden and Skridulaupen.

See also
List of mountains of Norway

References

Skjåk
Mountains of Innlandet